Deep Space: Operation Copernicus is a 1987 video game published by Sir-Tech Software.

Gameplay
Deep Space: Operation Copernicus is a game in which the player must use a Katani class ship to eliminate Andromedan warships that have invaded United Planets territory.

Reception
David M. Wilson reviewed the game for Computer Gaming World, and stated that "If the game's slow pacing doesn't put the player off initially, the game will give players a competitive run for their money and much potential "bang for the buck" as the game progresses."

Reviews
Info

References

1987 video games
Apple II games
Commodore 64 games
DOS games
Sir-Tech games
Space combat simulators
Video games developed in the United States
Video games set in outer space